= McCarthy Square =

Square in Manhattan, New York

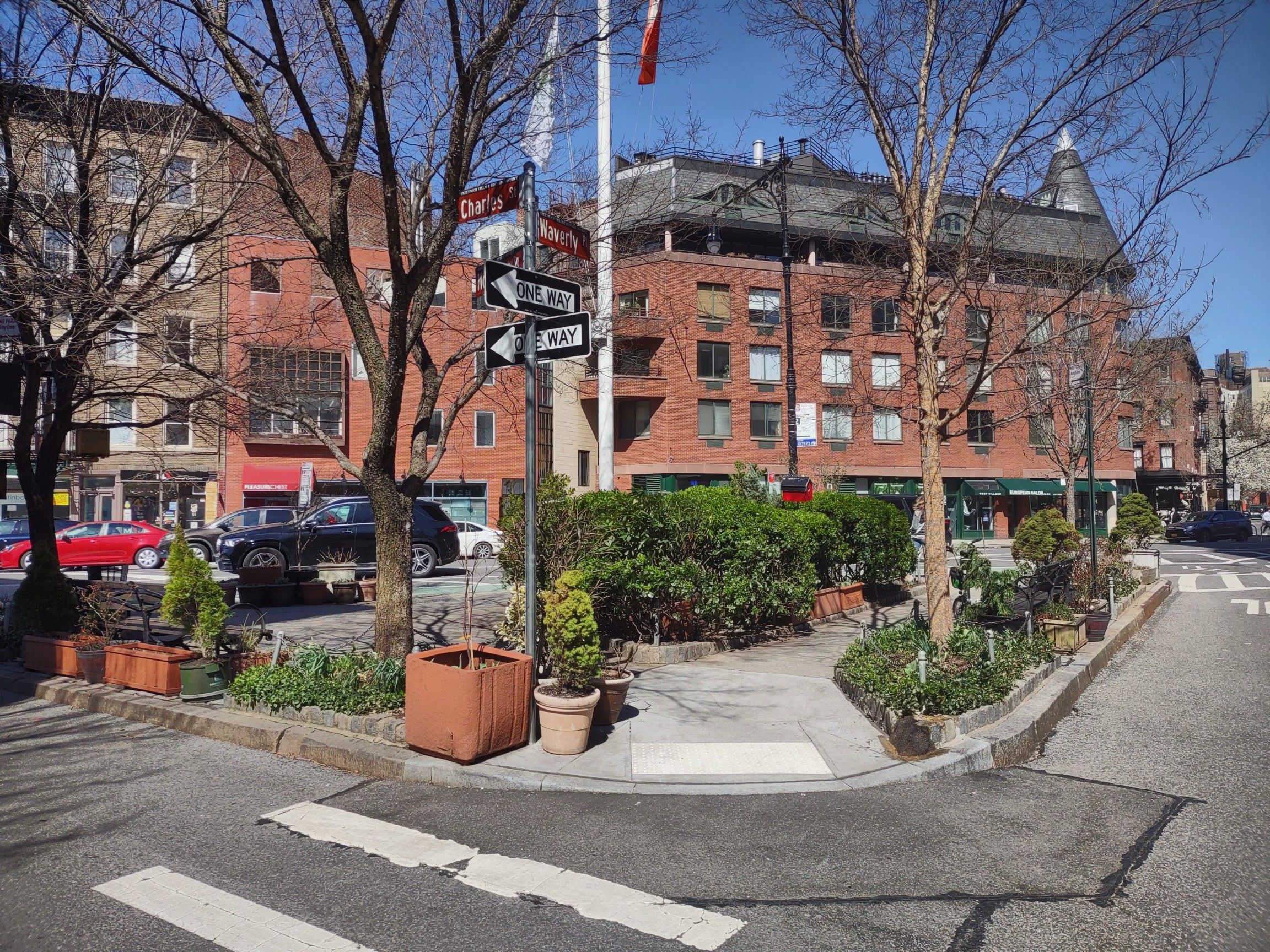
- McCarthy Square in 2022

- Location within New York City
- Location: Manhattan, New York City, New York, U.S.
- Coordinates: 40.7352°N 74.0017°W

McCarthy Square is a park in Manhattan, New York, named after Bernard Joseph McCarthy. The park and its memorial flagstaff, known as the Bernard McCarthy World War II Memorial, were dedicated in June 1943.
